The 2017 Women's LEN Super Cup was the 12th edition of the annual trophy organised by LEN and contested by the reigning champions of the two European competitions for women's water polo clubs. The contending teams were Russia's Kinef Kirishi (2016–17 Euro League champions) and Hungary's UVSE (winners of the 2016–17 LEN Trophy). The match was played just before the Men's Super Cup at the Császár-Komjádi Béla Uszoda, in Budapest, on 4 November 2017.

This was the first appearance in the Super Cup final for both teams, which won their first continental cup in the 2016–17 season. The European champions of Kinef Kirishi defeated 10–6 the home team of UVSE and won the Trophy.

Teams

Squads

Head coach: Márton Benczur

Head coach: Aleksandr Kabanov

Match

See also
2017 LEN Super Cup

References

External links
 Official LEN website
 Microplustiming.com (official results website)

Women's LEN Super Cup
S
L